Princess Mathilde Caroline of Bavaria (Augsburg, August 30, 1813 – Darmstadt, May 25, 1862) was the second child and eldest daughter of Ludwig I of Bavaria and Therese of Saxe-Hildburghausen.

Marriage
On 26 December 1833 in Munich, Mathilde married Louis of Hesse (1806–1877), eldest son and heir of Louis II, Grand Duke of Hesse and Wilhelmine of Baden.  Ludwig succeeded his father as Grand Duke Ludwig III in 1848. The marriage was childless.

Honours
  : 567th Dame of the Order of Queen Maria Luisa - .

Ancestry

Bibliography
 Barbara Beck: Mathilde,  Großherzogin von Hessen und bei Rhein, geb. Prinzessin von Bayern (1813–1862) (Arbeiten der Hessischen Historischen Kommission, Neue Folge, Band 7). Eduard Roether Verlag, Darmstadt 1993, ISBN 3-7929-0204-4

|-

1813 births
1862 deaths
House of Wittelsbach
House of Hesse-Darmstadt
Bavarian princesses
People from Augsburg
Hereditary Grand Duchesses of Hesse
19th-century German people
19th-century German women
Daughters of kings